Brian Smith (born 22 April 1975 in Castelar, Buenos Aires Province) is a racing driver from Argentina. Smith was the 1995 Argentine Formula Renault champion, before competing in the British Formula 3 Championship and eventually International Formula 3000, entering ten races at that level. After a brief appearance in the World Series by Nissan in 2001, and a subsequent hiatus from the sport, he moved to Argentine touring car racing.

Life and career

Formula Three 
Smith won the 1995 Argentine Formula Renault championship, earning him a place in British Formula 3 for the 1996 season with the TOM'S team. He finished tenth in the championship that year, with a best race finish of third and two starts from pole position. For 1997 season he moved to Fortec Motorsport, completing the season in seventh position overall. He took his only victory in this class at Pembrey Circuit on 17 August, with a fastest lap of 50.079 seconds which remains the official track record to this day.

International Formula 3000 
Smith's Formula Three results earned him a seat in International Formula 3000 with Nordic Racing for the 1998 season, qualifying sixth on his debut at Oschersleben. His best result of eighth place came at the Pau Grand Prix, the sixth round of the championship, but he did not compete further in the season due to financial constraints. His race seat was taken by Kevin McGarrity. Recalled to the sport for the 1999 season with Monaco Motorsport, he matched his best 1998 result of eighth at the season opener at Imola, but this would prove to be his only finish of the season. After failing to qualify for rounds 3 and 4 in Spain and France respectively, he was dropped in favour of Cyrille Sauvage.

There was an abortive attempt to found an Argentine-based team for the 2001 season, with Smith and Nicolas Filiberti as drivers.

After Formula 3000 
After his potential F3000 drive failed to materialise, Smith raced at one weekend of the 2001 World Series by Nissan season for PSN Racing, scoring a single point for a tenth-place finish in one of his two races. This was his last race until 2006, when he signed up to compete in Top Race V6 and TC2000, an Argentine touring car championship. He continues to race in that category, and also has a business importing cars.

Racing record

Complete International Formula 3000 results
(key) (Races in bold indicate pole position) (Races in italics indicate fastest lap)

References 

1975 births
Formula Renault Argentina drivers
Argentine racing drivers
International Formula 3000 drivers
British Formula Three Championship drivers
TC 2000 Championship drivers
Top Race V6 drivers
Living people
Turismo Carretera drivers
Nordic Racing drivers
Fortec Motorsport drivers
TOM'S drivers